Trekky Records is an independent record label based in Chapel Hill, North Carolina.  The label was created in 2001 by Chapel Hill natives Martin Anderson and Will Hackney (while the two were still in middle school and high school, respectively) as an outlet for their friends' music.  The label has since grown into a prominent musical collective, known for releasing albums in a signature 3-part format which includes a vinyl record, a compact disc, and an MP3 download.

Artists
Allelai
Alvarez Painting
Auxiliary House
Barghest
The Beauregards
Brice Randall Bickford
Butterflies
Choose Your Own Adventure
 Phil Cook
Embarrassing Fruits
Endless Mic
Loamlands
Lost in the Trees
Mortar and Pestle
The Never
The Physics of Meaning
Straight No Chaser
 Sylvan Esso
The Trekky Yuletide Orchestra
Vibrant Green
Westfalia

References
Footnotes

General references
 Independent Weekly feature article
 Trekky Records Showcase brings it home for the Flying Anvil and lil' Greensboro
Trekky Highway
Local label revolution

External links
 Trekky Records official website

Record labels established in 2001
American independent record labels
Indie rock record labels
Companies based in Chapel Hill-Carrboro, North Carolina